Michael Piccolruaz (born 31 December 1995) is an Italian professional rock climber. He competed at the 2020 Summer Olympics.

Career 
At the 2016 World Cup, he finished second.

At the 2017 IFSC Climbing European Championships, he finished third in the overall combined competition.

He qualified for the 2020 Summer Olympics after the IFSC reallocated spots that were unused due to cancelled competitions.

References

Italian rock climbers
Living people
1995 births
People from Bolzano
Sport climbers at the 2020 Summer Olympics
Olympic sport climbers of Italy